Alma Franca Maria Norsa  (31 July 1920 – 9 August 2020), known professionally as Franca Valeri, was an Italian actress, playwright, screenwriter, author, and theatre director.

Life and career
Born in Milan as Alma Franca Maria Norsa, she managed to survive the Holocaust in Milan with her non-Jewish mother due to a fake I.D. which purported her to be the illegitimate daughter of a gentleman from Pavia. Her Jewish father and brother were able to flee to Switzerland.

Since her father did not want her to become an actress, Norsa adopted the stage name Valeri in the 1950s as suggested by a friend of hers who was reading a book by French critic and poet Paul Valéry.

Valeri started her career on stage in 1947, and in 1949 she co-founded the Teatro dei Gobbi, along with Luciano Salce and her future husband Vittorio Caprioli. On the radio, she created and played the characters of La signorina Snob (Mrs. Snob), Cesira la manicure and Sora Cecioni. She co-starred in such films as A Hero of Our Times (1955), The Sign of Venus (of which she co-wrote both the story and the screenplay), and Il vedovo, as well as others. She often wrote her scenes in the films she starred, even those where she played small roles. Among the major films she co-wrote, Parigi o cara (1962) is a rare case where the story is focused on her role only.

In the 1960s, 1970s and 1980s, Valeri also frequently worked for the Italian TV. Directed by Antonello Falqui, she starred in Studio Uno, Le divine and Sabato Sera.

In the 1980s and early 1990s she starred in a series of commercials for Pandoro Melegatti, which were well received and stretched over a number of years (Pandoro being a seasonal product tied to the Christmas holidays).

During the 2005–2006 theatrical season, she performed her own monologue, La Vedova di Socrate ("Socrate's Widow"), and Les Bonnes, by Jean Genet. In January 2008 she played the role of Solange in Les Bonnes at Milan's Piccolo Teatro.

On 8 May 2020 Valeri received an Honorary David di Donatello Award.

Valeri turned 100 on 31 July 2020 and died nine days later, on 9 August 2020.

Filmography

Actress

Cinema 

Luci del varietà (1951) – Mitzy, Hungarian designer
The Two Sergeants (1951)
Toto in Color (1952) – Giulia Sofia
Solo per te Lucia (1952)
Villa Borghese (1953) – Elvira (segment Concorso di bellezza)
Questi fantasmi (1954)
Le signorine dello 04 (1955) – Carla, shift manager
The Sign of Venus (1955) – Cesira
Piccola posta (1955) – Lady Eva
Il bigamo (1956) – Isolina Fornaciari
Un eroe dei nostri tempi (1957) – De Ritis' widow
Mariti in città (1957) – Olivetti
La ragazza del palio (1958) – countess Bernardi
Non perdiamo la testa (1959) – Beatrice
Il moralista (1959) – Virginia
Arrangiatevi! (1959) – Marisa 'Siberia'
Il vedovo (1959) - Elvira Almiraghi
Rocco and His Brothers (1960) – widow (uncredited)
Mariti in pericolo (1960) – Gina
Crimen (1960) – Giovanna Filonzi
Leoni al sole (1961) – Giulia
I motorizzati (1962) – Velia
Parigi o cara (1962) – Delia Nesti
Le motorizzate (1963)
The Shortest Day (1963)
Gli onorevoli (1963) – Bianca Sereni
I cuori infranti (1963) – Fatma Angioj (segment La manina di Fatma)
I maniaci (1964) – wife (segment Il pezzo antico)
Io, io, io... e gli altri (1966) – journalist
La ragazza del bersagliere (1967) – Bice Marinetti
Scusi, facciamo l'amore? (1968) – Diraghi
Basta guardarla (1970) – Pola Prima
Nel giorno del Signore (1970) – Anticoli's widow
Ettore lo fusto (1972) – Cassandra
Ultimo tango a Zagarolo (1974) – (playing the role of a) film director
La signora gioca bene a scopa? (1974) – Giulia Nascimbeni
L'Italia s'è rotta (1976)
Come ti rapisco il pupo (1976) – Dada
La Bidonata (1977) – Giovanna Bronchi
Grazie tante – Arrivederci (1977) – lady on the bus
Tanto va la gatta al lardo... (1978) – Maria
It's Not Me, It's Him (1980) – Carla Weiss
Un amore in prima classe (1980) – Mrs. Della Rosa
Non ti riconosco più amore (1980) – Maritza
Paulo Roberto Cotechiño centravanti di sfondamento (1983) – countess
Tosca e le altre due (2003) – Emilia
Alberto il grande (2013) – herself

Television

 La cantatrice calva, directed by José Quaglio (1967)
 Felicita Colombo, directed by Antonello Falqui (1968) - TV series
 Le donne balorde, written and played by Franca Valeri, directed by Giacomo Colli (1970) - TV series
 Sì, vendetta..., directed by Mario Ferrero (1974) - TV series
 Nel mondo di Alice, directed by Guido Stagnaro (1974) - TV series
 Le avventure della villeggiatura, directed by Mario Missiroli (1974)
 Il barone e il servitore, directed by Davide Montemurri (1978) - TV series
 La strana coppia, stage direction by Franca Valeri, tv direction by Roberto Russo (1989) - play
 Papà prende moglie, directed by Nini Salerno (1993) - TV series
 Norma e Felice, directed by Giorgio Vignali (1995) - TV series
 Caro maestro, directed by Rossella Izzo (1996-1997) - TV series
 Come quando fuori piove, directed by Mario Monicelli (2000) - TV series
 Linda e il brigadiere, directed by Gianfrancesco Lazotti and Alberto Simone (2000) - TV series
 Non tutto è risolto - TV film (2014)

Screenwriter 

The Sign of Venus, directed by Dino Risi (1955)
Leoni al sole, directed by Vittorio Caprioli (1961)
Parigi o cara, directed by Vittorio Caprioli (1962)
Listen, Let's Make Love, directed by Vittorio Caprioli (1967)
Sì, vendetta..., directed by Mario Ferrero (1974) - TV series
 Tosca e altre due, directed by Giorgio Ferrara (2003)

Books

References

Further reading
 Emanuela Martini, Franca Valeri: una signora molto snob, Lindau, 2000,

External links
 

1920 births
2020 deaths
Actresses from Milan
Italian film actresses
Italian stage actresses
Italian radio personalities
Italian television actresses
20th-century Italian actresses
21st-century Italian actresses
Ciak d'oro winners
David di Donatello winners
Italian centenarians
20th-century Italian Jews
Women centenarians